Turn of the Century is a bestselling novel by Kurt Andersen published in 1999.

References

1999 American novels